Sylvia Elvira Infantas Soto (born 14 June 1923) is a Chilean singer, actress, and folklorist.

Early years
Infantas was born in Santiago in 1923. She was the daughter of tenor, Jorge Infantas, and grew up in the El Almendral neighborhood of Valparaíso.

Singing career
She began her singing career in 1942, performing on various radio stations. She was chosen as the best "melodic singer" of 1943 by Radiomanía magazine. She eventually became noted for her performances of Chilean folk music and led the groups "Silvia Infantas y los Baqueanos" (1953-1959) and "Silvia Infantas y los Cóndores" (1960-1969).  In 1962, she participated in the third annual Viña del Mar International Song Festival; her performance of "El loro aguafiestas" (with backing from Los Cóndores) won first place in the competition.

Infantas was a central figure in Chilean folk music from 1942 to 1970. She made international tours of Argentina, Uruguay, Peru, Ecuador, Colombia, Venezuela and Panama with Los Baqueanos between 1953 and 1959 and with Los Cóndores between 1960 and 1969. She also toured West Germany and Spain with Los Cóndores.

In 1955, composer Vicente Bianchi presented his musical interpretation on Pablo Neruda's poems "Tonadas de Manuel Rodríguez", "Canto a Bernardo O'Higgins" and "Romance de los Carreras". These works were recorded and popularized by Infantas and Los Baqueanos.  Their recording of Música para la Historia de Chile has been recognized as an outstanding contribution to the culture of Chile.

Acting career
Infantas also developed a career as an actress at the Teatro de Ensayo de la Universidad Católica (TEUC)  between 1946 and 1952. She acted in plays such as El gran farante, El tiempo y los Conway, Contigo en la soledad, El cid, El burlador de Sevilla, Invitación al castillo, Pygmalion, El senador más honorable, La pérgola de las flores, y La anunciación a María. For the latter, she won the Caupolicán Award for "best actress" in 1950. She also acted in the 1968 film Ayúdeme usted compadre.

Awards and honors
In 2009 she was named "Figura Fundamental de la Música Chilena" by the "Sociedad Chilena del Derecho de Autor" (SCD).  In 2015, she was awarded the President of the Republic National Music Award in the category "Folk Music". She received the award from President Michelle Bachelet at age 92 in an official ceremony at the La Moneda Palace.

In March 2019, in the context of the commemoration of the month of women, a biography titled "Silvia Infantas, voz y melodía de Chile" was published; it was written by music journalist, David Ponce.

Discography

Silvia Infantas y los Baqueanos 
 Música para la historia de Chile (1955)
Tonadas de Manuel Rodriguez(1955)
Romance de los Carrera(1955)
Canto a Bernardo O'Higgins(1956)
La Independencia de Chile (1955)
Chile compañero
A la mar,marinero
Yo vengo de San Rosendo
La refalaita
Sólo al mar
Patitos en la laguna
Carretita Chancha
Consejos por casamiento
Tristeza India
Eternamente
Huaso
Canción del brindis
Huaso ladino
Vamos,corazón
Feliz cumpleaños
Somos los buenos muchachos
La barquilla del amor
Eternamente
Pinceladas del pago
La pena de mi canto
Los lagos de Chile
Al pie de una guitarra
La rosa y el clavel
Arriba las palmas
Echándole el pelo
La amasandera de Quilipín
La chiquilla que baila
Entre mate y mate
Aradito de palo
Allá va mi huaso
Caldito de ave
¡Viva la Cueca!
La blanca azucena
Ramoncito,el camarón
Ja Jai qué linda la Cueca
 Yo conocí a una a una morena
Ilusión campesina
El marinero
Así es mi tonada
La Cueca del gorila
Aló aló
Hermanos Lagos
Corazones partidos
El canario
Los finaos
La batelera
El casamiento

Silvia Infantas y los Cóndores 
 Bajando pa' Puerto Aysén (1uas964)
 Rosita de Cachapoal (1964)
 Cuando baila mi morena. La cueca: su origen, su música, sus estilos (1965)
 ¡Con permiso...! Soy la cueca (1968)
 Huaso pintiao (196x)
 Cantarito de Greda 
Si vas para Chile
La consentida
Racimito de uva negra
En Chillán planté una rosa
Camino de luna
Fiesta del campo
Mis recuerdos
La Juana Rosa
Apología de la cueca
Campanilla de plata
La palomita
La rosa blanca
Los dichos chilenos
Tonadas para la Patria
 "Huasita Regalona
Mi guitarra
Campito de mi tierra
Zorzalito
La gitana
Porqué se fue
Tierra chilena
Tiro y tiro y el huaso firme
Los lagos de Chile
Mi casa de campo
Échame el lazo(1964)

Solo artist 
 Héroes y tradiciones (1999)

References

1923 births
Living people
20th-century Chilean women singers
Women in Latin music